The 2014 American Athletic Conference football season was the 24th NCAA Division I Football Bowl Subdivision football season of the American Athletic Conference (The American). The season was the second since the breakup of the former Big East Conference, which lasted in its original form from its creation in 1979 until 2013.

The 2014 season was the first with the new College Football Playoff in place. From 1998 to 2013, FBS postseason football was governed by the Bowl Championship Series. With the move to the new format, The American is no longer an Automatic Qualifying conference (AQ), and is considered a member of the "Group of Five" (G5) with Conference USA, the Mid-American Conference, Mountain West Conference, and the Sun Belt Conference. Whereas under the previous system the champion of The American was guaranteed an automatic berth to a BCS bowl game, now only the highest-ranked member of the "Group of Five" is guaranteed to receive a bid to one of the six major bowls.

The American consisted of 11 members: Cincinnati, East Carolina,  Houston, Memphis, SMU, South Florida, Temple, Tulane, Tulsa, UCF, and UConn. The regular season and conference play began on August 28, when Temple visited Vanderbilt, and Tulane visited Tulsa.

Previous season
The UCF Knights were the 2013 American Champions, finishing 8–0 in conference and 12–1 overall. The Knights earned the conference's final BCS automatic bid before college football moved to a playoff system. UCF upset No. 6 Baylor 52–42 in the 2014 Fiesta Bowl, and finished the year ranked in the Top–10.

In other bowl games, Cincinnati lost to North Carolina 39–17 in the Belk Bowl. In their final years as members of The American, Louisville defeated  Miami 36–9 in the Russell Athletic Bowl, and Rutgers lost to Notre Dame 29–16 in the Pinstripe Bowl.

Preseason

Coaching changes
 Bob Diaco was hired to replace Paul Pasqualoni (and interim coach T. J. Weist) at Connecticut.
 George O'Leary signed a contract extension with UCF.
 September 8 – SMU Head Coach June Jones resigned Citing personal issues, Defensive Coordinator Tom Mason was interim head coach at SMU
 December 1 – Tulsa fired Head Coach Bill Blankenship

Preseason Poll
The 2013 American Athletic Conference Preseason Poll was announced at the 2014 American Athletic Conference Media Day in Newport, Rhode Island on July 29, 2014.

 Cincinnati (17)
 UCF (7)
 Houston (6)
 East Carolina
 SMU
 USF
 Memphis
 Temple
 UConn
 Tulane
 Tulsa

 (first place votes)

Head coaches
 Tommy Tuberville,  Cincinnati
 Bob Diaco, Connecticut
 Ruffin McNeill, East Carolina
 Tony Levine, Houston
 Justin Fuente, Memphis
 June Jones, SMU
 Willie Taggart, South Florida
 Matt Rhule, Temple
 Curtis Johnson, Tulane
 Bill Blankenship, Tulsa
 George O'Leary, UCF

Rankings

Schedule

Schedule source:

Week 1

Bye Week: Cincinnati

Week 2

Bye Week: Cincinnati, UCF

Week 3

Bye Week: Memphis, SMU, Temple

Week 4

Bye Week: Tulsa

Week 5

Bye Week: East Carolina, Houston, UCF

Week 6

Bye Week: Connecticut, South Florida, Temple, Tulane

Week 7

Bye Week: SMU

Week 8

Bye Week: Connecticut, East Carolina, Memphis

Week 9

Bye Week: Houston, Tulane, Tulsa

Week 10

Bye Week: SMU

Week 11

Bye Week: Cincinnati, East Carolina, South Florida, UCF

Week 12

Bye Week: Houston, Connecticut

Week 13

Bye Week: Temple

Week 14

Bye Week: Tulane

Week 15

Bye Week: Memphis, South Florida, Tulsa

Bowl games

Bowl eligibility

Bowl eligible
 Memphis (9–3)
 Cincinnati (9–3)
 UCF (9–3)
 East Carolina (8–4)
 Houston (7–5)
 Temple (6–6)

Bowl ineligible
 South Florida (3–8)
 Tulsa (2–10)
 Tulane (3–9)
 SMU (1–11)
 Connecticut (2–10)

Records against other conferences

American vs. power conferences

American vs. FBS conferences

Players of the week

Position key

Awards and honors

Conference awards
The following individuals received postseason honors as voted by the American Athletic Conference football coaches at the end of the season

Home game attendance
.

 Cincinnati will be playing all its 2014 Paul Brown Stadium due to ongoing renovations to Nippert Stadium, capacity: 65,535.
Games highlighted in green were sell-outs.

References